Tidewater Inn is a historic hotel in Easton, Talbot County, Maryland, United States. It is a Colonial Revival brick, hip-roofed, four-story hotel with flanking three-story wings and an addition on the north wing.  The original section was completed in 1949, with an addition to the north constructed in 1953. The floor plan of the original building is a flattened chevron shape. It served as the preeminent hostelry and community gathering place on the Maryland Eastern Shore during the time when new automobile-oriented transportation routes intensified the volume of visitors.

The Tidewater Inn was listed on the National Register of Historic Places in 2007.

References

External links
 at Maryland Historical Trust
Tidewater Inn website

Hotels in Maryland
Buildings and structures in Talbot County, Maryland
Hotel buildings on the National Register of Historic Places in Maryland
Hotel buildings completed in 1949
Hotel buildings completed in 1953
National Register of Historic Places in Talbot County, Maryland
1949 establishments in Maryland